Aaj Ki Housewife Hai... Sab Jaanti Hai (International Title: Modern Homemaker) is an Indian television drama broadcast on Zee TV. Suhasi Goradia Dhami and Anirudh Dave are the lead actors of the series. Having already been broadcast on Zee TV, the show is set to air on English-Dubbed channel Zee World in Africa.

Story

The story revolves around Kanhaiyya Chaturvedi, a dabang policeman, and a journalist Sona and how the two get married. Sona quits her job to show how important a housewife is. Sona then becomes an ideal housewife for her family. The show is set against the backdrop of Uttar Pradesh.

Cast

 Anirudh Dave - Kanhaiyya Chaturvedi
 Suhasi Goradia Dhami - Sona Kanhaiyya Chaturvedi
 Himani Shivpuri - Sunaina Chaturvedi
 Monica Khanna - Neelam Uddham Chaturvedi
 Vijayendra Kumeria - Uddham Chaturvedi
 Vandana Singh (actress) - Chitraasi Kanhaiyya Chaturvedi
 Parikshit Sahni - Gyaneshwar Chaturvedi
 Rita Bhaduri - Girija Devi
 Rajesh Jais - Govardhan Chaturvedi
 Aanchal Dwiwedi - Bindiya Govardhan Chaturvedi
 Prashant Chawla - Manohar Chaturvedi
 Preeti Puri - Renu Manohar Chaturvedi
 Garima Jain - Julie Chaturvedi
 Shyam Masalkar - Durgesh
 Shivangi Sharma - Darshana
 Rahul Pendkalkar - Chikku Manohar Chaturvedi
 Pooja Singh - Julie Govardhan Chaturvedi
 Ketki Dave - Sarla
 Sushmita Mukherjee - Indrani Devi
 Suchita Trivedi - Maya

Casting

Ragini Khanna was initially cast as the lead of the show. Date problems resulted in Khanna being replaced by Suhasi Goradia Dhami.

References

External links

Indian television soap operas
Zee TV original programming
Hindi-language television shows
2012 Indian television series debuts
2013 Indian television series endings
Television series about families
Television series set in the 2010s